This article features the discography of Albanian singer and songwriter Alban Skënderaj. His discography includes three studio albums, two live albums and numerous singles as a lead artist.

Albums

Studio albums 

 Fllad në shkretirë (2006)
 Melodi (2008)
 Ende ka shpresë (2011)

Live albums

Singles

As lead artist

As lead artist

References

External links 

Discographies of Albanian artists